The 2000 United States Senate election in Maine was held November 7, 2000. Incumbent Republican U.S. Senator Olympia Snowe was re-elected to a second term, defeating Democratic candidate Mark Lawrence.

Candidates

Democratic 
 Mark W. Lawrence, former President of the Maine State Senate

Republican 
 Olympia Snowe, incumbent U.S. Senator

Campaign 
Snowe, a popular moderate incumbent, outpolled and outspent Lawrence. The two candidates agreed to debate on October 15 and 25.

Results

See also 
 2000 United States Senate elections

References 

2000 Maine elections
Maine
2000